The name Francesca has been used for three tropical cyclones in the Eastern Pacific Ocean.
 Hurricane Francesca (1966)
 Hurricane Francesca (1970)
 Hurricane Francesca (1974)

The name Francesca has also been used for one tropical cyclone in the Southwest Indian Ocean. 
 Cyclone Francesca (2002) 

Pacific hurricane set index articles
South-West Indian Ocean cyclone set index articles